Mount Eddy is the highest peak of the Trinity Mountains, a mountain range of the Klamath Mountains System, located in Siskiyou County, and Trinity County in northern California.

The mountain is in the Mount Eddy RNA, a Research Natural Area on the Shasta-Trinity National Forest, a unit of the United States Forest Service. The mountain is composed of mesozoic ultramafic rock, predominantly serpentinized peridotite.

Geography

The peak is west of Mount Shasta City and the massive Mount Shasta volcano. It is protected within the Shasta-Trinity National Forest.

The mountain receives heavy snowfall during the winter due to its altitude.

The mountain is named in honor of Olive Paddock Eddy, who is mistakenly held to be the first woman to climb Mount Shasta. She was 8 months pregnant at the time that she is credited with climbing the volcano.  Harriet Catherine Eddy was actually the first woman to summit the mountain.  Nelson Harvey Eddy arrived in the area from New York State in 1856. He later became a successful rancher in the Shasta Valley. The original Wintu name might have been Num-mel-be-le-sas-pam or "west blaze mountain".

See also
 
 List of highest points in California by county
 List of Ultras of the United States

References

External links
 
 

Mount Eddy
Mountains of Siskiyou County, California
Mountains of Trinity County, California
Mount Eddy
Mountains of Northern California